The 1996 Genovese Hamlet Cup was a men's tennis tournament played on outdoor hard courts at the Hamlet Golf and Country Club in Jericho, New York in the United States and was part of the World Series of the 1996 ATP Tour. It was the 16th edition of the tournament and ran from August 19 through August 25, 1996. Fifth-seeded Andriy Medvedev won the singles title.

Finals

Singles

 Andriy Medvedev defeated  Martin Damm 7–5, 6–3
 It was Medvedev's only title of the year and the 10th of his career.

Doubles

 Luke Jensen /  Murphy Jensen defeated  Hendrik Dreekmann /  Alexander Volkov 6–3, 7–6
 It was Luke Jensen's only title of the year and the 9th of his career. It was Murphy Jensen's only title of the year and the 3rd of his career.

References

External links
 ITF tournament edition details

Genovese Hamlet Cup
Connecticut Open (tennis)
Genovese
1996 in American tennis